Franc Gartner (born 19 September 1904, date of death unknown) was a Yugoslav cyclist, who rode for Hermes Ljubljana. He competed in the individual and team road race events at the 1936 Summer Olympics.

References

External links
 

1904 births
Year of death missing
Yugoslav male cyclists
Olympic cyclists of Yugoslavia
Cyclists at the 1936 Summer Olympics
Sportspeople from Ljubljana
Slovenian male cyclists